Jimmy Douglas (January 12, 1898 – March 5, 1972) was a U.S. soccer goalkeeper who spent his career in the first American Soccer League (ASL).  He earned nine caps with the U.S. national team, making his first appearance for the "Stars and Stripes" at the 1924 Summer Olympics.  Notably, he finished his international career at the 1930 FIFA World Cup, where he posted the first "clean sheet" in World Cup history.  Douglas was inducted into the National Soccer Hall of Fame in 1953.

Playing career
Douglas began his organized playing career with the youth club, Central Juniors of Newark, New Jersey in 1907 when he was nine years old.  Over the next fourteen years he played for a variety of amateur teams including Ryerson, Antlers, Erie and Swansons.  In 1922, he signed with Harrison S.C. of the American Soccer League (ASL).  However, he remained an amateur, refusing to accept any payment.  In the 1922-1923 ASL season, Douglas played twenty-three games, winning fourteen and gaining a 2.44 goals against average (GAA).  In 1923, he moved to the Newark Skeeters (at times called Newark F.C.).  Douglas spent two seasons with Newark, still maintaining his amateur status.  In the fall of 1925, Douglas began playing for the New York Giants.  However, the Newark Skeeters still listed Douglas on their rosters and the Giants were forced to forfeit several games after teams complained to the league.  After the Giants got that problem straightened out, Douglas continued to play for them until October 1927 when he moved to the Fall River Marksmen.  After one season in Fall River, Douglas then played twelve games of the 1928–1929 season with Philadelphia Field Club before moving to the Brooklyn Wanderers for three games.  He then finished the season back with the Fall River Marksmen.  In 1929, Douglas joined the New York Nationals.  In 1930, Charles Stoneham, owner of the Nationals, renamed his team the New York Giants when the original Giants changed their name to New York Soccer Club.  Douglas continued with the new Giants through the 1930 spring and fall season before moving to the New York Americans in 1931.  He played only seven games, then retired.

National team
Douglas earned nine caps with the U.S. national team between 1924 and 1930.  His first game came as a member of the national team in the 1924 Summer Olympics.  He backstopped the U.S. to a 1–0 victory over Estonia on May 25, 1924, Douglas was named the game's MVP.  Then four days later, the U.S. lost to Uruguay 3-0 which put the U.S. out of the tournament.  Douglas then played the next two 1924 U.S. games.  In 1925, he was in the nets for a U.S. 1–0 shutout of Canada in Montreal.  In 1930, he returned to the national team at the 1930 FIFA World Cup.  Douglas shutout Belgium and Paraguay before losing to Argentina in the semifinals.  About four minutes into that game, Douglas twisted his knee, then two U.S. players were injured.  As the rules did not allow substitutes at the time, Douglas and his teammates were forced to play injured.  Following the World Cup, the U.S. traveled to Rio de Janeiro where it lost 4–3 to Brazil.  Douglas finished his U.S. career with four wins and three shutouts.

The National Soccer Hall of Fame inducted Douglas in 1954.  Douglas died on March 5, 1972, in Point Pleasant, New Jersey.

References

External links
 1930 World Cup
 National Soccer Hall of Fame bio

1898 births
1930 FIFA World Cup players
American soccer players
Soccer players from New Jersey
United States men's international soccer players
Olympic soccer players of the United States
Footballers at the 1924 Summer Olympics
Association football goalkeepers
American Soccer League (1921–1933) players
Harrison S.C. players
Newark Skeeters players
New York Giants (soccer) players
Fall River Marksmen players
Philadelphia Field Club players
Brooklyn Wanderers players
New York Nationals (ASL) players
New York Giants (soccer, 1930–1932) players
New York Americans (soccer) (1930–1933) players
National Soccer Hall of Fame members
1972 deaths
People from East Newark, New Jersey
Sportspeople from Hudson County, New Jersey